Herbert Edward Barnhill (July 2, 1913 – July 25, 2004) was an American baseball catcher in the Negro leagues. He played from 1938 to 1946, with the Jacksonville Red Caps, Cleveland Bears, Kansas City Monarchs, and Chicago American Giants.

References

External links
 and Baseball-Reference Black Baseball Stats and Seamheads

1913 births
2004 deaths
Jacksonville Red Caps players
Cleveland Bears players
Kansas City Monarchs players
Chicago American Giants players
Baseball players from Georgia (U.S. state)
People from Hazlehurst, Georgia
20th-century African-American sportspeople
Baseball catchers
21st-century African-American people